The North West Senior League is the provincial cricket league within the North West Cricket Union jurisdiction in Ireland, which covers counties Londonderry, Fermanagh, and part of Tyrone in Northern Ireland and County Donegal in the Republic of Ireland. The league has fifteen members. The season begins with the teams divided into two groups, and after playing each other once the top four teams from each group play off as the Premier League to determine the champions, while the remaining seven clubs play a separate competition. It is sponsored by Long's Supervalu. Teams play each other twice per season, once at home and once away, each season, with two points awarded for a win and one for a tie or for “no result”.

The league began as the County Derry League from 1894 until 1897, when it stopped after only five teams entered. It resumed again in 1904.

Sectarian attacks forced the City of Derry club to withdraw from the North West League at the start of the Troubles.

Members for 2021 season

List of champions

Summary of winners

See also
North West Senior Cup
Irish Senior Cup
Leinster Senior League
Ulster Cup
NCU Senior League

References for list of league champions
CricketIreland Archives
J. Clarence Hiles (2003), A History of Senior Cricket in Ulster, Comber:Hilltop Publishing Ltd

References

External links
 North West of Ireland Cricket Union

 
Senior cricket leagues in Ireland
Cricket in Ulster